Jean Brunier (9 October 1896 – 23 June 1981) was a French racing cyclist. He won the French national road race title in 1922.

References

External links

1896 births
1981 deaths
French male cyclists
Cyclists from Paris